Gladstone Park may refer to:

Gladstone Park, Victoria, an Australian suburb
Gladstone Park, Chicago
Gladstone Park station, a railway station
Gladstone Park, London